Noralv Teigen  (27 September 1932 – 13 December 2017) was a Norwegian actor,  theatre instructor and theatre director.

Teigen was born in Høyanger. He made his stage debut at Folketeatret in 1955, and was later assigned with Nationaltheatret and Riksteatret. From 1988 to 1991 he was appointed theatre director at Sogn og Fjordane Teater. Teigen also worked at the Radioteatret.

In 2002, he  received the King's Medal of Merit.  He resided in Frogn and died at Drøbak  in  2017.

External links

References

1932 births
2017 deaths
People from Høyanger
People from Frogn
Norwegian theatre directors
20th-century Norwegian male actors
Norwegian male stage actors
Recipients of the King's Medal of Merit